Kareli is a district of Georgia, in the region of  Shida Kartli. Some northern territories of the district are part of the self-proclaimed republic of South Ossetia and have not been under control of the Georgian government since 1992. Located in the central part of Georgia on the Shida Kartli plain. The municipality is bordered on the east by Gori, on the west by Khashuri, and on the south by Borjomi. Area of the municipality - 687.9 km2 Population - 41 316 people. There are 35 state public schools and 1 private school-gymnasium, a secondary vocational school, 1 central library, a cultural center and a museum of local lore in Kareli municipality.

History
Kareli is mentioned in historical sources from the Early Bronze Age, and Kareli as a developed city center already in the XVI-XVII centuries. Mentioned. Most of today's Kareli was part of the Tsitsishvili nobility-Satsitsiano, where he lived and worked as a military-political, builder, cultural-educational, scientific and medical figure. Kareli is known for many historical facts: the Ecclesiastical Council of Ruisi-Urbnisi in 1103, Battle of Aradeti in 1483 and others.

The current territory of Kareli Municipality was included in Gori Mazra of Tbilisi Province until 1917. From 1930 in Gori and Khashuri districts, and from 1939 as a separate district. 1963-64 Rejoined these districts. From 1965 it was formed as a separate district within the present borders.

Economy
In Kareli municipality there are mainly fields with investment potential: processing industry and agriculture. Agar sugar factory and food industry enterprises are located in Kareli municipality. The leading fields of agriculture are: fruit growing, horticulture, horticulture-horticulture, viticulture, animal husbandry and others. The main highway and highways of the Transcaucasian Railway pass here.

Population

Kareli municipality includes one municipal center and 82 villages, which are united in 18 administrative units. The administrative center is Kareli, the administrative units are: 
Urbnisi 
Ruisi 
Agara 
Bebnisi 
Kekhijvari 
Khvedureti 
Akhalsopeli 
Mokhisi 
Dvani 
Zghuderi 
Bredza 
Ftsa 
Dirbi 
Breti 
Abisi 
Avlev 
Giganti

Historic monuments

Important monuments of architecture and culture are located in Kareli: 
Mdzovreti Castle-Hall Complex 
Samtsevrisi church
Kintsvisi Monastery 
Samtsevrisi Castle

Kozifa Monastery 
Orkhevi Monastery 
Ortubani Monastery
Dzadzvi Monastery
historical villages Ruisi and Urbnisi. 
Also, the beautiful natural lake of Bateti, which is 1313 m above sea level. In the gorge of the river Khvedurula there is a so-called red stone waterfall, Trekhvi boilers, where the Leonti Mroveli stone cross was found.

See also 
 List of municipalities in Georgia (country)

External links 
 Districts of Georgia, Statoids.com
 shidakartli.gov.ge,

References 

Municipalities of Shida Kartli